The Five Thirty Show is a Scottish topical magazine show, which began broadcasting in Northern and Central Scotland on STV on Monday 28 January 2008. The programme was aired live from STV's Pacific Quay studios in Glasgow, with live link-ups to other parts of Scotland often featuring.
 
In May 2009, it was revealed that the programme would be axed and replaced by a new hour-long format entitled The Hour. The last regular edition of the programme aired on Friday 15 May 2009 and concluded with co-host Rachel McTavish's departure from STV. 
The final live programme was followed by a week of compilation specials.

Format
The show was originally intended to report on the top stories of the day from across STV's Northern and Central regions in a more relaxed style to its sister shows, Scotland Today and North Tonight (now known as STV News at Six). Within a short time of launch, the format was changed to include more lifestyle & feature items and a greater focus on entertainment stories.

Presenters
The programme team since launch;

Main Presenters
 Stephen Jardine (28 January 2008 – 14 May 2009)
 Debi Edward (28 January 2008 – 25 April 2008)
 Rachel McTavish (28 April 2008 – 15 May 2009)

Roving Reporters
 Vicky Lee (relief presenter)
 Gerry McCulloch (relief presenter)
 Chris Harvey (North Scotland Correspondent)
 Natasha Stillwell

Entertainment Correspondent
 Grant Lauchlan

Weatherman
 Seán Batty

Related shows 
 STV News at Six
 The Hour
 Live at Five

References

External links

2000s Scottish television series
2008 Scottish television series debuts
2009 Scottish television series endings
English-language television shows
Scottish television shows
STV News